Saint-Pé-de-Bigorre is a railway station in Saint-Pé-de-Bigorre, Occitanie, France. The station is on the Toulouse–Bayonne railway line. The station is served by TER (local) services operated by the SNCF.

Train services

The station is served by regional trains towards Bordeaux, Bayonne, Pau and Tarbes.

References

Railway stations in Hautes-Pyrénées
Railway stations in France opened in 1867